August Sabbe (1 September 1909 – 27 or 28 September 1978) was one of the last surviving Estonian members of the Forest Brothers, a group of citizens of Estonia, Latvia and Lithuania who resisted and fought against the Soviet occupation of their three nations. Sabbe hid in the forests of Estonia, living off of the land like other Forest Brethren.

In 1978, at the age of 69, Sabbe was found near his birthplace of Paidra, Lasva Parish in southeastern Estonia by two KGB agents posing as fishermen. When they attempted to arrest him, he leaped into the Võhandu River and either drowned accidentally or deliberately wedged himself under a submerged log. The KGB, which took photographs before and after the attempted arrest, maintained that Sabbe drowned while attempting to escape. But some have observed that the river is narrow, sluggish and shallow at that point, an unlikely place for an accidental drowning, and that the open field on the opposite bank and the river's lazy loops gave an elderly man no place to flee from two young, physically fit pursuers. The Forest Brethren's code of conduct and the quickness of Sabbe's reaction suggest that Sabbe was prepared not to be taken alive.

A stone monument to Sabbe stands in a pine grove overlooking the site of his death. It is located just west of Route 65 between Leevi and Tsolgo, almost exactly on the boundary between Põlva and Võru counties.

See also
 Józef Franczak, the last anti-communist fighter in Poland (died 1963)
 Kalev Arro, Forest Brothers member (died 1974)

References

1909 births
1978 deaths
People from Võru Parish
People from the Governorate of Livonia
Estonian anti-communists
Soviet dissidents
Suicides by drowning
Suicides in the Soviet Union
Military personnel who committed suicide
Burials at Raadi cemetery
Estonian independence activists
1978 suicides